Nassim Benkhodja (born February 2, 1985 in Krasnodar, Soviet Union) is an Algerian football player. He currently plays for MC El Eulma in the Algerian Ligue Professionnelle 2.

Personal
Benkhodja was born on February 2, 1985, in Krasnodar, Soviet Union, to an Algerian father and a Russian mother. At the age of 1, he moved back with his family to Algeria.

Career
Benkhodja began his career at the ASFJB, a football academy in Béjaïa. His youth career also included time with MO Béjaïa and Lycee Sportif de Draria, where he played with Mohamed Lamine Zemmamouche.

Honours
 Won the Algerian Cup once with ES Sétif in 2012

References

External links
 DZFoot Profile
 

1985 births
Living people
Algerian footballers
Algerian Ligue Professionnelle 1 players
Algeria youth international footballers
Algerian people of Russian descent
Sportspeople from Krasnodar
AS Khroub players
ES Sétif players
MO Béjaïa players
NA Hussein Dey players
Russian people of Algerian descent
Russian emigrants to Algeria
Amal Bou Saâda players
Association football goalkeepers